The Gabba, officially called the Brisbane Cricket Ground, is an Australian sports stadium in the Brisbane suburb of Woolloongabba. The ground has hosted international cricket since 1931 when the first Test match was played there between Australia and South Africa. A total of 62 Test matches have been played at the Gabba. The ground has also staged 78 One Day Internationals (ODIs), the first was played in 1979 between England and the West Indies.

Donald Bradman became the first player to score a Test century at the ground when he made 226 against South Africa in 1931. Bradman's innings of 226 is one of only 5 double centuries seen at the ground. The other double centuries were scored by fellow Australians Keith Stackpole, Greg Chappell, and Michael Clarke, and the Englishman Alastair Cook. Clarke's 259 not out in 2012 is the highest score made on the ground. Clarke and Greg Chappell jointly hold the record for most centuries at the Gabba with 5. Ricky Ponting, David Warner and Matthew Hayden have all scored 4 centuries at the ground. The fastest Test century at the Gabba was made by Travis Head against England in 2021; Head scored a century off 85 balls on his way to 152 off 148.

Twenty nine ODI centuries have been scored at the ground. The first of these was made by the Englishman David Gower in 1983 against New Zealand. Gower's innings, 158 from 118 deliveries, remains the highest ODI score by an overseas player at the ground. The highest overall ODI score at the ground is 163 which was made by David Warner against Sri Lanka in 2012. Dean Jones and Mark Waugh are the only players to have hit two ODI centuries at the Gabba.

Key
 * denotes that the batsman was not out.
 Inns. denotes the number of the innings in the match.
 Balls denotes the number of balls faced in an innings.
 NR denotes that the number of balls was not recorded.
 Parentheses next to the player's score denotes his century number at the Brisbane Cricket Ground.
 The column title Date refers to the date the match started.
 The column title Result refers to whether the player's team won, lost or if the match was drawn, tied, or a no result.

List of centuries

Test centuries

The following table summarises the Test centuries scored at the Brisbane Cricket Ground.

One Day International centuries

The following table summarises the One Day International centuries scored at the Brisbane Cricket Ground.

See also

References

Gabba
Cricket grounds in Australia
Gab